Alisa Chumachenko is a Russian entrepreneur.

Education 
Chumachenko graduated from the Russian Academy of Theatre Art in 2004 with a degree in Art Direction.

Career 
In 2010, she founded "Game Insight", a company building online games. In 2015, she stepped down as CEO of Game Insight. In 2017, she founded GOSU Data Lab, a company using machine learning to provide data to gamers and games companies. By 2018, GOSU Data Lab had raised $2.3 million.

Awards 

 In 2012, Erns & Young named her “Entrepreneur of the Year 2012”.
 In 2012, Forbes named her “Manager of the Year 2012.”
 In 2018,  Forbes named her one of Europe's Top 50 Women in Technology.

Quotes 
"The hardest thing to overcome is yourself. The next game always has to be bigger than the previous one. That’s what I think about every day"

References 

Russian Academy of Theatre Arts alumni
Living people
Russian businesspeople
Year of birth missing (living people)
Online games
Businesspeople in technology